

King of Kings is a lofty title applied to monarchs or deities.

King of Kings may also refer to:

Films 
The King of Kings (1927 film), a Cecil B. DeMille film
King of Kings (1961 film), a Nicholas Ray film 
The King of Kings (1963 film), a 1963 Czech film
King of Kings (1969 film), a Hong Kong film starring Peter Yang

Games 
King of Kings: The Early Years, a video game by Wisdom Tree
King of Kings (1988 video game), a video game by Namco
a supplement to the Rome at War board wargame series

Music 
King of Kings (Don Omar album), a 2006 album by reggaeton artist Don Omar
King of Kings (Leaves' Eyes album), a 2015 album by symphonic metal band Leaves' Eyes
King of KingZ, a 2001 album by German-Tunisian rapper Bushido
"King of Kings", a 1963 song by Jimmy Cliff
"King of Kings", a heavy metal song from Gods of War (Manowar album)
"King of Kings", a song by Motörhead released on the WWE Wreckless Intent compilation
"King of Kings", a song from Flowers (Echo & the Bunnymen album)
"King of Kings", a song from Rock City (Royce Da 5'9" album)
 King of Kings (Hillsong song), a song from Hillsong Worship

Other 
 King of Kings, a reference to Jesus Christ
Henrik Larsson, a former professional footballer most noted for his time at Celtic F. C.
King of Kings (horse), an Irish Thoroughbred racehorse and sire
King of Kings (statue), a 2004 statue of Jesus in Monroe, Ohio
"King of Kings", a nickname for professional wrestler Triple H
 "King of Kings", a verse from Percy Shelley's poem, Ozymandias
 King of Kings Tournament 1999, a series of mixed martial arts events held by Fighting Network Rings (RINGS)
 King of Kings Tournament 2000, a series of mixed martial arts events held by Fighting Network Rings (RINGS)
 King of Kings, the second novel in the Warrior of Rome series by Harry Sidebottom
 King of Kings (kickboxing), European kickboxing promotion
King of Kings, the thirty-seventh episode in Part 5 of JoJo's Bizarre Adventure: Golden Wind

See also
High King (disambiguation)
King of All Kings (disambiguation)

pt:King of Kings